Fábio Francisco Barros da Trindade (born 28 April 1988 in Paulista), or simply Paulista, is a Brazilian footballer who plays as a striker. He currently plays for Sete de Setembro Esporte Clube.

Honours

Individual 
Pernambuco State League Top Scorer: 2011

References

External links 

 

1988 births
Living people
Brazilian footballers
Brazilian expatriate footballers
Sportspeople from Pernambuco
Association football forwards
Santa Cruz Futebol Clube players
Clube Atlético do Porto players
Sport Club do Recife players
ABC Futebol Clube players
Criciúma Esporte Clube players
People from Paulista